The Ministry of Finance of Kosovo is a department of the Government of Kosovo in charge of public finances of Kosovo. The headquarters are on Mother Teresa Street in Pristina.

Officeholders (2008–present)
Ahmet Shala, 10 January 2008 - 22 February 2011
Bedri Hamza, 22 February 2011 - 9 December 2014
Avdullah Hoti, 9 December 2014 - 7 August 2017
Agim Krasniqi, 7 August 2017 - 9 September 2017
Bedri Hamza, 9 September 2017 - 3 February 2020
Besnik Bislimi, 3 February 2020 - 3 June 2020
Hykmete Bajrami, 3 June 2020 - 24 February 2021
Agim Krasniqi (acting), 24 February 2021 - 22 March 2021
Hekuran Murati, 22 March 2021 - Incumbent
Source:

See also
 Government of Kosovo
 Economy of Kosovo

References 

Finance
Kosovo
Kosovo, Finance
Government of Kosovo
Economy of Kosovo